Bordelonville is an unincorporated community and census-designated place (CDP) in Avoyelles Parish, Louisiana, United States. As of the 2010 census, it had a population of 525.

Demographics

Etymology
Bordelonville was named for Remi Bordelon, who was instrumental in getting the town a post office.

References

Census-designated places in Louisiana
Census-designated places in Avoyelles Parish, Louisiana